GWR 2900 "Saint" Class No. 2999 Lady of Legend is a 4-6-0 steam locomotive completed in 2019 to a design by George Jackson Churchward. It was based on the frames and boiler of 4900 "Hall" Class No. 4942 Maindy Hall, and was largely constructed at Didcot Railway Centre in Didcot, Oxfordshire, where it is now based. Described as "building the 78th Saint", the project started in the 1970s to look at building a new 'Saint', since none of the original class-members were preserved.

Maindy Hall 

No. 4942 Maindy Hall was a 4-6-0 locomotive of the GWR's 4900 Hall class. It was built in 1929 at Swindon. After being withdrawn from service in 1963, it was moved to Woodham Brothers scrapyard in Barry, Vale of Glamorgan, South Wales, in 1964 and was bought by the Didcot Railway Centre in 1974, who also bought 5900 Hinderton Hall.

The Saint project
Following the formation of the society in the 1970s a plan was formed to build a new 2900 Saint, since none of the original class members were preserved (the last class member being no 2920 Saint David which was withdrawn from service in October 1953 and was sent straight for scrap).

It was decided to rebuild 4942 Maindy Hall from scrapyard condition (there being another ten members of the 4900 Hall class in preservation). This is appropriate as the original 4900 class prototype of 1925 was converted from 2900 class engine Saint Martin. It was also decided (like 60163 Tornado) to number the locomotive as a new member of the class, sequential to the highest-numbered original Saint, No.2998, Ernest Cunard. An early production lot of Saints were named after historical, mythological or poetical 'Ladies', which corresponds with the name Lady of Legend chosen for 2999.

Some of the parts used in the construction of 2999 are original GWR parts that had at one time been fitted to Saints, including a connecting rod from 2906 Lady of Lynn and whistle from 2910 Lady of Shalott. The chimney is also an original part, but is from a 6800 class 4-6-0. The engine was largely constructed in an early configuration, with straight frames, lever reversing gear and a flush riveted tender tank, but for practical reasons there are a number of components and features that are later in design than the Lady series as they originally left the factory.  

The height of 2999 was therefore reduced, to allow it to operate on the mainline. Mainline operation also requires the additional equipment that none of the original members of its class had, including: AWS (A similar system called ATC was used by the GWR), TPWS, OTMR & GSM-R. A speedometer would also need to be fitted to the loco as when outshopped the locomotive wasn't fitted with one. A 2019 decision from Didcot regarding the ceasing of mainline running means that the engine will only see use at Didcot and on other heritage railways from that year.

Naming 2999

Many names were submitted in a competition run by the group which were constructing 2999 and the name eventually chosen was Lady of Legend. Other names that were submitted in the competition to name the new engine included: Lady in Waiting, Lady Diana, Lady of Lourdes, Saint Dai, Maindy Court (reference to donor loco 4942 Maindy Hall), Prince Charles, John Betjeman & Phoenix.

Atlantic option
An integral part of the Saint project is the 'Atlantic option'. Although it is intended by the Saint project that the completed engine will run primarily in its 4-6-0 configuration as a Saint because of the plan to go mainline, it is planned to have the engine run for a period during its 10-year boiler certification as a 4-4-2 Atlantic. The number it is expected to carry when converted into its 4-4-2 Atlantic form is 191 and the names include Atlantic and Churchward.  This mirrors the original Saint class of which 13 were built as 4-4-2s for comparative purposes and later converted to 4-6-0s.

References

External links
 Official website on Wayback Machine
 2999 Lady of Legend at Didcot
 Building a Saint documentary

2999
Standard gauge steam locomotives of Great Britain
4-6-0 locomotives
Steam locomotives of the 21st century